Stewart John Llewellyn Bevan (10 March 1948 – 20 February 2022) was a British actor, best known for his performances in both film and television. His extensive career includes the films Brannigan (1975), The Ghoul (1975), House of Mortal Sin (1976), Ivanhoe (1982), Chromophobia (2005) and The Scouting Book for Boys (2009) while on television, he played Clifford Jones in Doctor Who (1973) and Ray Oswell in Emmerdale (1977).

Early life
Bevan was born into a Welsh family, his parents being Ray Bevan and wife Gwen. He spent his early years in Southall, Middlesex. After leaving school at the age of 15, he became a young manager in Pierre Cardin's menswear shop. At around this time he met the first love of his life Jackie, at the local Youth Club who encouraged him to join the local Amateur Dramatics society. Bevan participated in a festival at The Questors Theatre where he won an award for Best Actor. Shortly after this he decided to enrol at the Corona Theatre School he became friends with fellow actor Michael Des Barres On his second day, the pair went to audition for small roles as teenage schoolchildren for the film To Sir, with Love which they both got, and performed side by side with Lulu and Sidney Poitier. During this time, Stewart performed as a dancer with Jayne Mansfield on her cabaret tour of clubs in the North of England.

Career
After his role in To Sir, with Love (1967), Bevan had a part in the film Lock Up Your Daughters! (1969) before spent two years in a production of Conduct Unbecoming in the West End from 1969 to 1971 playing Lieutenant Edward Millington alongside Jeremy Clyde, Jeremy Bulloch and Gareth Hunt. His film credits include Burke & Hare (1972), The Flesh and Blood Show (1972), Steptoe and Son Ride Again (1973), The Ghoul (1975), Brannigan (1975) and House of Mortal Sin (1976).

TV roles include: Public Eye, Secret Army, Shoestring, Blake's 7, The Enigma Files, Ivanhoe, Airline, The Gentle Touch, Casualty, Silent Witness and Murder in Mind. He is well known for playing Professor Clifford Jones, a love interest for the Doctor's companion Jo Grant (Katy Manning), in the 1973 Doctor Who serial The Green Death.

Bevan also made many appearances in theatre including in Chase Me, Comrade, The Taming of the Shrew, Under Milk Wood, The Importance of Being Earnest, Come and Be Killed (1972), Fatal Affair (1974), Candida (1977) and Deathtrap in 2002 with David Soul and Susan Penhaligon.

In 2012, Bevan voiced the character of Inspector Nettles in an episode of the audio series Iris Wildthyme with Katy Manning for Big Finish Productions. Bevan also provided his voice for the part of BOSS for Big Finish Productions in their Torchwood audio series with Manning and John Barrowman.

In 2019, Bevan reprised his role as Clifford Jones opposite Manning in a trailer for the Doctor Who Season 10 Blu-ray box-set in which he and Manning also feature in a documentary where they revisit the filming locations for The Green Death. In 2020, the pair starred in another trailer in their roles from Doctor Who, this time for the Season 8 Blu-Ray box-set. A trailer for the Season 9 Blu-Ray box set confirms that Cliff has recently died, with Jo Grant acting to set up a charitable foundation in his name to continue his desire to protect Earth.

Personal life and death
Prior to filming Doctor Who Bevan became engaged to Katy Manning they stayed together for two years, 1974 to 1976, reflecting the plot of their joint appearance in Doctor Who in which Manning's character left the series to marry Bevan's character.

Bevan began a relationship with Virginia Moore, an actress, in 1977. They had two daughters.

Bevan died on 20 February 2022, two weeks before his 74th birthday.

Filmography

Film

Television

References

External links
 

1948 births
2022 deaths
20th-century English male actors
21st-century English male actors
English male film actors
English male television actors
English people of Welsh descent
People from St Pancras, London
Male actors from London